Rickmer Rickmers is a sailing ship (three masted barque) permanently moored as a museum ship in Hamburg, near the Cap San Diego.

Rickmer Clasen Rickmers, (1807–1886) was a Bremerhaven shipbuilder and Willi Rickmer Rickmers, (1873–1965) led a Soviet-German expedition to the Pamirs in 1928.

Rickmer Rickmers was built in 1896 by the Rickmers shipyard in Bremerhaven, and was first used on the Hong Kong route carrying rice and bamboo. In 1912 she was bought by Carl Christian Krabbenhöft, renamed Max, and transferred to the Hamburg-Chile route.

In World War I Max was captured by the Government of Portugal, in Horta (Azores) harbour and loaned to the United Kingdom as a war aid. For the remainder of the war the ship sailed under the Union Jack, as Flores. After World War I she was returned to the Portuguese Government, becoming a Portuguese Navy training ship and was once more renamed, as NRP Sagres (the second of that name). In 1958, she won the Tall Ships' Race.

In the early 1960s Sagres (II) was retired from school ship service when the Portuguese Navy purchased, from Brazil, the school ship Guanabara (originally launched in Germany in 1937 as Albert Leo Schlageter). In 1962, the former Guanabara was commissioned as school ship with the name Sagres (III). At the same time Sagres (II) was renamed Santo André and reclassified as depot ship. The NRP Santo André remained moored at the Lisbon Naval Base, being decommissioned in 1975.

She was purchased in 1983 by an organisation named Windjammer für Hamburg e.V., renamed for the last time, back to Rickmer Rickmers, and turned into a floating museum ship.

References

External links

Museum website in German
Pictures of the Rickmer Rickmers in German
Interactive Panorama: Rickmer Rickmers in English

Museum ships in Germany
Windjammers
Barques
Individual sailing vessels
Ships of Portugal
Tall ships of Germany
World War I merchant ships of Germany
World War I merchant ships of the United Kingdom
Training ships
Museums in Hamburg
Tourist attractions in Hamburg
1896 ships
Ships built in Bremen (state)